IF Limhamn Bunkeflo 2007, also known simply as LB07, are a Swedish football club based in Malmö. The club is affiliated with Skånes Fotbollförbund and play their home games at Limhamns IP. The club colours, reflected in their crest and kit, are red and white. Formed on 1 January 2008, the club has played one season in Sweden's second tier league Superettan and three seasons in the third tier league Division 1 Södra. The club is currently playing in Division 3, the fifth tier of the Swedish football league system, where the season lasts from April to October.

History
They were officially formed on 1 January 2008, when Superettan team Bunkeflo IF merged with Limhamns IF. The newly merged team took Bunkeflo's place in the league and were relegated to the Division 1 Södra in December 2008.

Season to season

Attendances

In recent seasons, IF Limhamn Bunkeflo had the following average attendances.

Current squad

As of April 2017

Technical staff
As of April 2017

References

External links
  

 
Sport in Malmö
Association football clubs established in 2008
Football clubs in Malmö
2008 establishments in Sweden